The Montalto di Castro nuclear power station was a nuclear power plant at Montalto di Castro in Italy. Consisting of two BWR units each of 982 MWe, it was approaching completion in 1988 when the Italian government decided to close all nuclear plants as a result of the 1987 referendum. In February 1988 the two units were eighty percent complete, representing about a five billion dollars investment. It never operated.

Its area and some of the already built structures are now used by the fossil-fuel power station "Alessandro Volta", the biggest power station in Italy.

Reactor data 
The nuclear power plant has two units:

References

External links

 Nuclear power in Italy at the WNA site.

Nuclear power stations using boiling water reactors
Unfinished nuclear reactors
Former nuclear power stations in Italy